The Awarau River, usually known as Larry's Creek is located within the South Island of New Zealand. It also drains part of the Brunner Range and there was a track along that range linking to Lyell by 1901, though none existed in 1874. A track also ran south over Kirwan Hill to the Montgomerie River.

A  forestry road runs north of the river from SH69 to Larrys Creek Track, which runs a further  to the site of the Caledonian Gold Mine. It is the most northerly in the Reefton goldfield, in albite-epidote hornfels facies, which are less than 370 million years old. Remnants of a stamping battery and a Robey portable steam engine are at the mine site. Colinton was formed in 1874 as the township for the mine (and the river was sometimes called Colin River). By 1878 it had a population of 44, but was gone by 1901. Just upstream is a deep, rocky gorge.

The only bridges over the river are the Stillwater–Ngākawau railway and SH69. Railway bridge 74 was a  road-rail bridge of 7 spans, built in 1905 for £2,915. A bridge was planned at Colinton in 1880, but never built.

Tūī, Anthornis melanura (korimako, makomako, kōmako, or bellbird), Petroica macrocephala (ngirungiru, or tomtit) and Petroica australis (Kakaruwai, or South Island robin) live in the bush.

References 

Buller District
Rivers of the West Coast, New Zealand
Rivers of New Zealand